Catherine Tobin (died 1903) was a Victorian era author and artist who travelled with her husband and wrote books around the experiences as well as translator for a book on the area.

Life
Born Catherine Ellis, daughter of Lister Ellis of Crofthead, Cumberland she married Thomas Tobin on 12 September 1835 and with whom she had one son, Arthur Lionel Tobin who was born when they lived in Ballincollig, County Cork. He died as a young man, injured in battle. Though the family lived in a few houses in Cork their main residence was Oriel House. However Tobin and her husband shared an interest in travel and antiquities and spent considerable time in the middle and near east. She wrote a number of books due to this interest and travel as well as translating another. At home in Cork, Tobin was a patron of the South Infirmary Victoria University Hospital for many years.

George Kelleher has suggested that while Thomas Tobin was an 'antiquarian and curio collector in the spirit of the Victorian age', his wife Catherine, 'was a far more considerable cultural figure'. Her work has served as the basis for a number of studies about the regions.

Originally from the UK, when her husband died, Tobin moved first to Albert House Mansion in London and then to Eastham House in Cheshire, where her brother in law James Aspinall Tobin lived. She died there on 23 April 1903.

Bibliography
 
 
  by Paul-Émile Botta (Trans.)

Gallery
Pictures from Tobin's 1855 book:

David Roberts views in 1839, published in The Holy Land, Syria, Idumea, Arabia, Egypt, and Nubia:

References

External links 
 

1903 deaths
British women writers
British women artists